Memento Mori is the debut album from the indie rock band The Bastard Fairies. The title of the album is the Latin phrase, "Remember that you are mortal". There are two versions of this album, one free to download, and one available in stores, which contains 5 tracks not available on the download.

The Bastard Fairies store album became available to download on May 1, 2007.

Personnel
Yellow Thunder Woman - Vocals, lyrics
Robin Davey - Guitar, other instruments
Coley Carnegie - Banjo

Free version track listing
"The Greatest Love Song" (3:53)
"Apple Pie" (3:08)
"Habitual Inmate" (5:01)
"The Boy Next Door" (2:17)
"Ode To The Prostitute" (3:24)
"We're All Going To Hell" (2:51)
"Everybody Has A Secret" (4:12)
"Moribund" (2:30)
"A Venomous Tale" (3:29)
"Guns And Dolls" (3:22)
"Memento Mori" (3:07)
"Ten Little Indians" (1:00)

Store album track listing
"The Greatest Love Song" (3:52)
"Apple Pie" (3:06)
"Habitual Inmate" (4:55)
"The Boy Next Door" (2:13)
"Ode To The Prostitute" (3:25)
"A Case Against Love" (2:55)
"We're All Going To Hell" (2:51)
"A Venomous Tale" (3:26)
"Everyone Has A Secret" (4:11)
"Maybe She Likes It" (4:15)
"Guns And Dolls" (3:18)
"Moribund" (2:26)
"Exoskeleton" (3:02)
"A Heathen's Lament" (2:59)
"Whatever" (3:37)
"Memento Mori" (3:03)
"Ten Little Indians" (0:59)

2007 debut albums
The Bastard Fairies albums
Albums free for download by copyright owner